Ralph Weymouth (May 26, 1917 – January 22, 2020) was a decorated Vice Admiral of the United States Navy and anti-nuclear campaigner.

Weymouth was born in Seattle to Ralph Wells Weymouth and his wife Lisbeth Cunningham Sewall. He graduated from the U.S. Naval Academy in 1938, served two years on surface ships, began naval aviator training, and earned his wings in 1941.

He was also awarded the Legion of Merit twice and the Distinguished Flying Cross four times. His service continued through the Korean and Vietnam Wars.

During service in post-war Japan, Weymouth became concerned at the effects of nuclear war on the inhabitants of Nagasaki and Hiroshima and became an opponent of nuclear weapons, becoming more active in retirement.

He married Laure Bouchage, of Breton descent, granddaughter of Anatole Le Braz, in 1940, and they had eight children, including Tina Weymouth, former bassist for Talking Heads and currently with Tom Tom Club, and architect Yann Weymouth.

Weymouth died at age 102 in Rockport, Maine, on January 22, 2020.

References

External links
National World War II Museum – Becoming a Naval Aviator – Ralph Weymouth

1917 births
2020 deaths
United States Navy admirals
Recipients of the Navy Cross (United States)
American centenarians
Men centenarians
Military personnel from Seattle
United States Naval Academy alumni
United States Navy personnel of World War II
United States Navy personnel of the Korean War
United States Navy personnel of the Vietnam War
American anti–nuclear weapons activists
Recipients of the Legion of Merit
Recipients of the Distinguished Flying Cross (United States)